Simon Robson was Dean of Bristol from 1598 to 1617.

Robson was born in West Morton and educated at St John's College, Cambridge. He held livings at Stainton, County Durham, Birkin, Blyborough and Weare, Somerset.

He died in May 1617.

References

16th-century English Anglican priests
17th-century English Anglican priests
Alumni of St John's College, Cambridge
Deans of Bristol
People from Keighley
1617 deaths
Clergy from Yorkshire